Fidelity Contrafund (symbol FCNTX) is a mutual fund operated and provided by Fidelity Investments. Its current manager is William Danoff, who has headed the fund since 1990. Contrafund's AUM (assets under management) as of July 2015 total over 112 billion USD. As of 2015 Contrafund was the second-largest actively-managed mutual fund in the US by assets, after AGTHX (Growth Fund of America, managed by American Funds), and was the largest mutual fund of any type managed by an individual.

History 
The fund's name stems from its original mandate in 1967: "the fund's mission was to take a contrarian view, investing in out-of-favor stocks or sectors." This strategy has changed since the 1990s to become a fund focused on growth investing in large companies, and the Contrafund's strong history of growth has led to its being "a stalwart of many 401(k) plans".

In 2015, Danoff's 25-year solo management became an issue of concern as Fidelity had not named a co-manager for Contrafund. Should Danoff become incapacitated without a co-manager or succession plan, Contrafund might face major redemptions from shareholders and lose its position in many large retirement plans which typically require at least three years of manager tenure.

References

External links  
 Fidelity Contrafund Product Page at Fidelity Investments
 Fund Prospectus

Stock funds
Mutual funds of the United States